The Green Hornet Strikes Again! is a 1941 Universal black-and-white 15 chapter movie serial based on The Green Hornet radio series by George W. Trendle and Fran Striker. It is a sequel to Universal's earlier serial The Green Hornet (1940). This was the 117th serial (the 49th with sound) of the 137 that Universal produced. The plot involves racketeering and is unusual for a movie serial by having mostly stand-alone chapters instead of each running into the next; this was also the case for Universal's first Green Hornet serial.

Plot
Wealthy publisher Britt Reid and his trusted Korean valet and sidekick disguise themselves as the crime fighting vigilantes, The Green Hornet and Kato. Over the course of 15 chapters, they battle the growing power of ruthless crime lord "Boss" Crogan and his varied rackets and henchmen across the city. Unknown to them, Crogan also has strong ties to foreign powers unfriendly to America...

Cast
 Warren Hull as Britt Reid and his alter ego The Green Hornet. Hull replaced Gordon Jones in this role and also provided the voice of the Hornet (instead of radio voice Al Hodge in the original serial).
 Wade Boteler as Michael Axford, Britt Reid's bodyguard
 Anne Nagel as Lenore "Casey" Case, Britt Reid's secretary
 Keye Luke as Kato, the Green Hornet's sidekick
 Eddie Acuff as Ed Lowery, a reporter
 Pierre Watkin (listed in the credits as "Pierre Watkins") as Boss Crogan, racketeer
 James Seay as Bordine, one of Boss Crogan's henchmen
 Arthur Loft as Tauer, Boss Crogan's chief henchman
 Joe Devlin as Dolan, one of Boss Crogan's henchmen
 William Hall as DeLuca, one of Boss Crogan's henchmen
 Dorothy Lovett as Frances Grayson, an aluminum heiress, and Stella Merja, an actress hired to replace her

Chapter titles
Source:

 Flaming Havoc
 The Plunge of Peril
 The Avenging Heavens
 A Night of Terror
 Shattering Doom
 The Fatal Flash
 Death in the Clouds
 Human Targets
 The Tragic Crash
 Blazing Fury
 Thieves of the Night
 Crashing Barriers
 The Flaming Inferno
 Racketeering Vultures
 Smashing the Crime Ring

References

External links

Nostalgia League review of The Green Hornet Strikes Again!

1941 films
American black-and-white films
1940s English-language films
Films based on radio series
Universal Pictures film serials
American sequel films
Films directed by Ford Beebe
Films directed by John Rawlins
1940s crime films
The Green Hornet films
American action adventure films
1940s action adventure films
Films with screenplays by George H. Plympton
1940s American films